Charles Joseph (born March 25, 1952 on Trinidad) is a retired athlete from Trinidad and Tobago who specialized in the 400 metres and 4 x 400 metres relay.

He attended the Seton Hall University, New Jersey, USA.

Achievements

External links
Best of Trinidad

1952 births
Living people
Trinidad and Tobago male sprinters
Athletes (track and field) at the 1972 Summer Olympics
Athletes (track and field) at the 1976 Summer Olympics
Athletes (track and field) at the 1980 Summer Olympics
Olympic athletes of Trinidad and Tobago
Athletes (track and field) at the 1975 Pan American Games
Pan American Games competitors for Trinidad and Tobago
Seton Hall Pirates men's track and field athletes